Ericodesma indigestana is a species of moth of the family Tortricidae. It is found in Australia, where it has been recorded from New South Wales, Victoria and Tasmania. The habitat consists of heathland and open treeless areas.

The wingspan is about 16 mm.

The larvae feed within spun shoots and leaves of Hibbertia species and rolled and webbed leaves of Arctotheca calendula.

References

Moths described in 1881
Archipini